Skoll or Saturn XLVII (provisional designation S/2006 S 8) is a retrograde irregular satellite of Saturn. Its discovery was announced by Scott S. Sheppard, David C. Jewitt and Jan Kleyna on 26 June 2006 from observations taken between 5 January and 30 April 2006.

Skoll is about 6 kilometres in diameter (assuming an albedo of 0.04) and orbits Saturn at an average distance of 17.6 Gm (million km) in 869 days, following a highly eccentric and moderately inclined orbit.

It was named in April 2007 after Sköll, a giant wolf from Norse mythology, son of Fenrir and twin brother of Hati.

References

 MPC: Natural Satellites Ephemeris Service
Mean orbital parameters from NASA JPL

External links

David Jewitt's pages

Norse group
Moons of Saturn
Irregular satellites
Discoveries by Scott S. Sheppard
Astronomical objects discovered in 2006
Moons with a retrograde orbit